The Keeping Room is a 2014 American Western film directed by Daniel Barber and written by Julia Hart. The film stars Brit Marling, Hailee Steinfeld, Muna Otaru, Sam Worthington, Amy Nuttall, and Ned Dennehy. It was screened in the Special Presentations section of the 2014 Toronto International Film Festival. The film was given a limited release in the United States on September 25, 2015, by Drafthouse Films. The film was made available on Netflix US on May 4, 2016.

Plot
Left without men in the dying days of the American Civil War, three Southern women - two white sisters, Augusta and Louise, and one african-american slave, Mad - must fight to defend their home and themselves from two rogue soldiers who have broken off from the fast-approaching Union Army. Augusta, the elder sister goes in search of medicine for her sister, Louise; who has been bitten by a raccoon. She stops off at a neighbor's house but finds the neighbor dead, having drunk a bottle of poison. She then goes to a bar, where she is told to leave by the barman. It is there that Augusta encounters Moses and Henry, soldiers from the army.

Late that night, Augusta, Louise and Mad hear noises from outside. It is revealed to be Moses and Henry and an intense shootout ensues. Henry rapes Louise and is shot dead by Mad, and Augusta injures Moses, but does not kill him. The three girls then go back to the kitchen and Mad reveals how she was raped often as a child.

A clatter outside makes Augusta and Mad investigate with guns; the culprit is found to be Bill, Mad's lover, who is then accidentally shot dead by Augusta. Before dying, he tells Mad "they're coming". In the morning, the girls realize that Moses is still alive and search the house. When they eventually find him, he tells Augusta he is a "bummer" (soldiers sent in advance to forage for food and find any deserters or survivors) for the army. Seriously wounded, Moses warns Augusta that; "Billy's coming, burning down everything in his path. Rest assured, it will be cruel". Augusta shoots him dead. The girls bury the bodies and debate whether they will stay and fight for their house. They eventually decide they will dress up as men, using the clothing from the dead soldiers. They set the house on fire and the last shot shows the girls walking into the distance, the army just catching up to their house.

Cast
Brit Marling as Augusta
Hailee Steinfeld as Louise
Muna Otaru as Mad
Sam Worthington as Moses
Kyle Soller as Henry
Ned Dennehy as Caleb
Amy Nuttall as Moll
Nicholas Pinnock as Bill

Production
The film was first announced in October 2012. Hart's script was inspired by her learning that her friends had two skeletons dating from the Civil War in their backyards and wondering how they got there. Initially the film was to star Olivia Wilde; she later left and was replaced by Brit Marling. Sam Worthington rounded out the cast in April 2013.

Filming
Principal photography began in June 2013 in Bucharest, Romania, and ended on July 18, 2013.

Reception
The Keeping Room received mixed to positive reviews. , the film holds a 75% approval rating on Rotten Tomatoes, based on 83 reviews with an average rating of 6.45/10. The website's critics consensus states: "Aided by its spare setting and committed performances, The Keeping Room is just fascinatingly off-kilter enough to overcome its frustrating stumbles." On Metacritic, it has a score of 58 out of 100, based on 21 critics' reviews, indicating "mixed or average reviews".

See also
List of films featuring slavery

References

External links

2014 films
2014 independent films
2014 action drama films
2014 Western (genre) films
American Civil War films
American Western (genre) films
American action drama films
American war drama films
2010s English-language films
Films about war crimes
Films directed by Daniel Barber
Films shot in Romania
Home invasions in film
2010s feminist films
2010s American films